Von Steuben Metropolitan High School (also known as Von Steuben Metropolitan Science High School) is a public 4–year magnet high school located on the border of the North Park and Albany Park neighborhoods on the north side of Chicago, Illinois, United States. Opened in 1930, Von Steuben is operated by the Chicago Public Schools district and is named for military officer Friedrich Wilhelm von Steuben.

Achievements 
Von Steuben was named an Outstanding American High School by U.S. News & World Report in 1999 and mentioned in Newsweek's America's Best High Schools list in 2003. According to the U.S. News & World Report in 2012, Von Steuben ranks at #49 at the state level and #1273 at the national level.

Athletics
Von Steuben competes in the Chicago Public League (CPL) and is a member of the Illinois High School Association (IHSA). Von Steuben sport teams are nicknamed Panthers. In the 2002–03 season, The boys’ sophomore basketball team won the Chicago Class AA city title. In 2004–05 and 2005–06, The boys' varsity water polo team won the city title. In the 2011–12 season, the boys' sophomore volleyball team were named city champions. In the 2014–2015 season the boys' freshman, JV, and varsity teams all were named city champions.
 In the 2022 season the Boys' Varsity Baseball team won their Conference. Also in 2022 the Boys Varsity Basketball team won the Consolation City Playoffs.

Fall

Boys' Soccer
Girls' Swimming
Girls' Volleyball
Girls' Tennis
Boys' and Girls' Cross-Country
Boys' and Girls' Golf

Boys' Football

Winter

Boys' NBAs and Girls' Basketball
Girls' Bowling
Boys' Swimming
Wrestling
Cheerleading 
Boys' and Girls' Indoor Track

Spring

Boys' Baseball
Girls' Softball
Boys' and Girls' Soccer
Boys' Tennis
Boys' Volleyball
Boys' and Girls' Volleyball
Boys' and Girls' Track and Field
Boys' and Girls' Water Polo

Notable alumni 
Charlene Barshefsky – former United States Trade Representative
Neil Bluhm - American billionaire real estate and casino magnate
Rosalyn Bryant – 1976 Olympic silver medalist in the 4x400 meter relay
Howie Carl – basketball player, played for Ray Meyer at DePaul University and played pro basketball for the NBA's Chicago Packers
Tamar Evangelestia-Dougherty – director of the Smithsonian Libraries and Archives
Albert Goldbarth – poet and author
Mike Nussbaum – actor and director
Ash-har Quraishi – broadcast journalist; formerly CNN's bureau chief in Islamabad
Marv Rotblatt – former MLB player (Chicago White Sox)
Lynn Sweet – Chicago Sun-Times Washington DC bureau chief
Israel Sanchez - former MLB player (Kansas City Royals)

References

External links
Official website
U.S. News & World Report 1999 article

Albany Park, Chicago
North Park, Chicago
Public high schools in Chicago